The Ariel Leader was a British motorcycle produced by Ariel Motorcycles between 1958 and 1965. A radical design, the Leader was fully enclosed with an integral windscreen and was the first British motorcycle to have optional flashing indicators. Ariel could not compete against Japanese imports and the last Ariel Leader was produced when the company closed in 1965.

Development

Designed by Val Page and Bernard Knight, The Ariel Leader featured a 250 cc two-stroke engine suspended from a monocoque 'backbone' fabricated from 20-gauge pressed  steel panels. The fuel tank was hidden inside this structure and accessed by lifting the hinged dual seat. A dummy petrol tank was used for storage and was large enough to fit a spare crash helmet. It was the fully enclosed bodywork (first developed by Phil Vincent for the innovative Vincent Black Prince) that was most prominent, as none of the working parts of the motorcycle were visible.

As well as a full body, the standard Leader features included a headlight trimmer, an extendable lifting handle for easy centrestand use, and a permanent windscreen mounting. Factory listed options included: integrated-design hard-luggage 'panniers', the first flashing indicators on a British motorcycle, a dash-mounted parking light, windscreen top-extension (adjustable on the move), a rear rack and a clock aperture built into a 'dashboard' (closed-off by an Ariel badge when not fitted).

Launch
Launched in mid-1958, the Leader claimed to offer the comfort of a scooter with the performance of a motorcycle. At first it sold well, and it won the Motor Cycle News Motorcycle of the Year award in 1959.  Ariel backed up the launch with a long list of options (unusual at the time), therefore few of the 22,000 Ariel Leaders produced were the same. Colour schemes were also a break with tradition, and included Oriental Blue or Cherry Red with Admiral Gray accents.

Ariel Arrow

This was a cheaper, stripped Leader produced from 1959 and was developed into the Golden Arrow 'sport' version in 1961.

A sister-machine designated Ariel Arrow 200 – with a smaller capacity of 200 cc, achieved by reducing the bore to 48.5  mm from 54 mm whilst retaining the same stroke – was available from 1964 to bring it into a lower tax band and benefit from lower UK rider insurance premiums.

In his 1964 Motor Cycle road test, Bob Currie reported good performance, with an absolute top speed – with "rider lying flat, of course" – of 74 mph and a cruising speed which could be held at 60 mph.

The bike had the usual Arrow ivory background colour, but with the tank and chaincase finished in either 'aircraft' blue or British Racing Green, and tank badges denoting 'Arrow 200'.

After the Ariel factory closure, in 1967 Ariel marketed its last motorcycle, the Arrow 200 produced for a time by BSA.

In 1960, a prototype Arrow with a four-stroke 349 cc twin-cylinder engine was made to sell alongside the Ariel Leader. The budget engine, designed by Val Page to do , was canted to fit the Arrow frame.

Demise
Ariel could not compete against Japanese imports. The Ariel factory closed in 1965, although the name remained under BSA to produce Ariel Arrows until 1967 and a commercially unsuccessful 49 cc banking trike named Ariel 3 in 1970.

Notes

References

See also
List of motorcycles of the 1950s

External links

Real Classic Guide Ariel Leader

Leader
Motorcycles introduced in 1958
Two-stroke motorcycles